Rita Dey is a former Test and One Day International cricketer who represented India. She is a right hand batsman and wicket-keeper who played two Tests and six One-Day Internationals.

She is a BCCI national selector (central) and the UPCA chairperson of the women's selection committee.

References

India women One Day International cricketers
India women Test cricketers
Indian women cricketers
Living people
Year of birth missing (living people)
Wicket-keepers